Nil Labrecque (born 20 July 1965) is a Canadian luger. He competed in the men's singles event at the 1988 Winter Olympics.

References

1965 births
Living people
Canadian male lugers
Olympic lugers of Canada
Lugers at the 1988 Winter Olympics
Sportspeople from Sherbrooke